Norwegian knitting (strikking)  has a history dating from the 16th century.

History
Knitted garments found in Norway have been dated as far back as between 1476 and 1525. Some of the most well known sweater patterns attributed to Norwegian colorwork knitting are the Setesdal Lusekofte and the Fana Fanacofte patterns. Selbu in Trøndelag county is also well known for the  Selburose pattern motif.  Selbu  mittens  first appeared as a vertical column of two snowflakes on the front side of the mittens. The origin of these mittens is attributed to a young girl named Marit Emstad who in 1857 attended church wearing what we now know as Selbu mittens, effectively sparking the imagination of knitters at the time who had never seen anything like it before.

Today there are over 300  registered  mitten patterns attributed to Selbu. There are several brands of Norwegian yarn available today for knitters, including Dale of Norway and Rauma Garn.  Dale of Norway has been a manufacturer of ready wear sweaters which have been worn by Norway's Olympic athletes since 1956. 

Many of their sweater patterns most closely associated with knitted  ski sweaters  have been published in English by the manufacturing company. 
The heritage of Norwegian knitting has been preserved, documented and translated into English language history and pattern books that are available to modern knitters, mostly notably by the author Annemor Sundbø. The yarn factory Rauma Ullvarefabrikk has also released a substantial number of Norwegian knitting patterns translated into English.

See also
Selburose
Mariusgenser
Lusekofte

References

Other sources  
 
Annemore Sundbo (2001) 
 Annemore Sundbo (2001) 
 Annemore Sundbo (2007) 
 Annemor Sundbø and Carol Huebscher Rhoades (2010)

External links
 Fair Isle and Norwegian Knitting: Lets Get Started
 Hillesvag Yarn (used by the Solveig Hisdal in her book "Poetry in Stitches".)

Knitting
knitting, Norwegian
knitting, Norwegian
Textile arts of Norway
Norwegian culture